Wanless station is a station in Wanless, Manitoba, Canada. The station is served by Via Rail's "The Pas-Pukatawagan" line for the Keewatin Railway twice per week in each direction. Wanless is part of the Rural Municipality of Kelsey.

References 

Via Rail stations in Manitoba